Symplocos iliaspaiensis is a plant in the family Symplocaceae, native to Borneo. It is named for Ilias Paie, a plant collector at the Sarawak Herbarium.

Description
The pale bark is smooth. The inflorescences bear yellow flowers.

Varieties
Two varieties of Symplocos iliaspaiensis are recognised:
Symplocos iliaspaiensis var. iliaspaiensis – Sarawak
Symplocos iliaspaiensis var. pedunculata  – Sabah, Brunei

Distribution and habitat
Symplocos iliaspaiensis is endemic to Borneo.

References

iliaspaiensis
Endemic flora of Borneo
Plants described in 1986